Odsal Stadium in Bradford, West Yorkshire, England, is the home of Bradford Bulls Rugby League team. It has also been used by the Bradford Dukes speedway team, BRISCA F1 and F2 stock cars, the football team Bradford City, following the Valley Parade fire, and for baseball, basketball, kabbadi, show jumping, tennis, live music, international Rugby League and the 1997 Speedway Grand Prix of Great Britain.

The stadium's highest attendance was 102,569 in 1954 for the Warrington-Halifax Challenge Cup Final replay, and for a domestic, non-final, Rugby League match, 69,429 at the third round Challenge Cup tie between Bradford Northern and Huddersfield in 1953. The stadium is owned by Bradford City Council, but due to financial problems the Rugby Football League purchased the lease on it in 2012.

History

1933–1935: Construction and opening
Formed in 1907, the Bradford Northern club had played at a number of venues including the Greenfield Athletic Ground in Dudley Hill and Bowling Old Lane Cricket Club's ground in Birch Lane. By the early 1920s, however, Birch Lane's limitations were clear and Northern began to seek another home. Precarious finances prevented the club being able to take up an offer to develop land off Rooley Lane or to upgrade and move back to Greenfield, but in 1933, Bradford City Council gave them the opportunity to transform land at Odsal Top into their home ground. On 20 June 1933 the club therefore signed a ten-year deal on the site, which was to become the biggest stadium in England outside Wembley.

The site was a former quarry which was then being used as a landfill tip. Ernest Call M.B.E., the Director of Cleansing for Bradford City Council devised a system of controlled tipping that saw 140,000 cart loads of household waste deposited to form the characteristic banking at Odsal. The club were to be responsible for boundary fencing, dressing rooms and seated accommodation.

To be able to turf the pitch, and other areas, a turf fund was put into place which raised a total of £900 to cover the work. A stand was erected at the cost of £2,000, which was paid for by the Rugby Football League. It held 1,500 on a mixture of benches and tip-up seats.

The ground was officially opened by Sir Joseph Taylor, President of Huddersfield on 1 September 1934. His club went on to beat the hosts 31–16, Australian winger Ray Markham scoring four tries in front of an estimated 20,000. The clubhouse and dressing rooms were officially opened before a match against Hull F.C. on 2 February 1935. Contemporary pictures show that as late as August 1935 the banking on the Rooley Avenue side was still being created.

1940–1979: Speedway and Rugby League internationals
In 1945, speedway began in Bradford with the Odsal Boomerangs. In the post-Second World War years, speedway proved extremely popular with crowds of over 20,000 regularly attending meetings at Odsal, with the 1946 average for the first year of the National League after the war. The highest speedway attendance during this period came on 5 July 1947 when 47,050 fans saw England defeat Australia 65–43 in a Test match. This remains the largest-ever speedway crowd for Odsal Stadium.

During the Second World War, the lower floor of the clubhouse was also used as an Air Raid Precautions centre, and one of the dressing rooms was the map room. On 20 December 1947, the largest ever attendance for an international test at Odsal was set when 42,685 saw England defeat New Zealand 25–9. The first floodlit rugby match in the North of England was held at Odsal in 1951. In September 1951, Council Engineer Ernest Wardley drew up a plan for a 92,000 capacity 'European' style stadium, at a cost of £250,000. Eventually £50,000 was spent on terracing the Rooley Avenue end in 1964, before the Wardley plan was officially dropped the following year.

After a disastrous 1960 season, the Panthers (previously the Odsal Boomerangs) left Odsal and in 1961 moved across town to the Greenfield Stadium, better known for greyhound racing. After the Panthers folded in 1962, Motorcycle Speedway would not return to Bradford for another 10 years.

Speedway returned to Odsal when promoters Les Whaley, Mike Parker and Bill Bridgett moved the British League Division Two side Nelson Admirals across the Pennines for the final eleven league meetings of the 1970 season and went on to adopt Bradford Northern as their name and red, black and amber as their colours. Northern would finish second in Division 2 in 1971, but from there results and attendances steadily declined and the team folded after 1973.

The second test of the 1978 Ashes series was played at Odsal, with Great Britain defeating Australia before a crowd of 26,761. The Lions team that day featured what was called a "Dad's Army" front row with Jim Mills, Tony Fisher and Brian Lockwood all being over the age of 30.

1980-1990s: Bradford City and the return of Speedway
The ground's clubhouse had to be refurbished when it was condemned in the mid-1980s. The social facilities were also upgraded at the same time.

Speedway returned to Odsal in 1985 after a ten-year absence when it was selected by the FIM to host the 1985 World Final.

Following the Valley Parade fire disaster of 1985, Bradford City played a handful of games at Leeds Road and Elland Road whilst the future of Valley Parade was decided. On 23 September 1985, a Football League delegation visited Odsal to view the stadium to pass it fit to host City's home games. Segregation fences were erected on the old Main Stand side and 1,000 uncovered seats were bolted onto the terracing – it was planned to install 7,000 in the future. Meanwhile, a further £1 million was spent to conform with new safety standards – bringing the total spent on Odsal to £3.5 million. New boundary walls, turnstiles, exit gates, a bus layby in Rooley Avenue and access road were added. Odsal played host to Bradford City's Division Two home games until December 1986. Odsal Stadium also held a modern-day attendance record for almost six years.

Like most British stadia, Odsal had its capacity substantially reduced by the safety measures introduced in the 1990s following the Hillsborough disaster and the findings of the Taylor Report.

2000–present: Redevelopments
At the dawn of the Super League era in 1996, Bradford Bulls wanted to attract new sponsors but had poor and outdated hospitality suites. In 2000 they announced plans to build hospitality suites at the South End of the stadium which would mean building on the track around the pitch, effectively ending speedway's association with Bradford. Construction started in 2001 and was completed in 2002 with Bradford Bulls playing two seasons at Valley Parade.

After London won the right to host the 2012 Olympic Games in 2008, plans were put in place for an Olympic Legacy Park at Odsal, which would mean redeveloping the stadium and the Richard Dunn Leisure Centre opposite; these plans never came to fruition and a Legacy Park was built in Sheffield instead.

In 2012, the Bulls got into severe financial difficulties and the RFL stepped in and bought the lease to Odsal. After struggling for some years, in early 2017 the Bulls were formally liquidated and a new phoenix club was formed by Andrew Chalmers, who announced plans to redevelop Odsal into a venue fit for Super League and international rugby league. These plans came to nothing and the club's ongoing running costs at the stadium, including the £72,000 rent payable to the Rugby Football League, led the Bulls to announce they were to leave Odsal for a financially prudent ground share with Dewsbury. On 1 September 2019, the club played their last game at Odsal, which had been the team's home ground for 85 years.

Nearby football club Bradford Park Avenue had discussed moving to Odsal on several occasions, most recently in 2018, but this did not come to fruition.

Usage

Rugby League

Test matches

Tour matches

Speedway
The rugby pitch at Odsal Stadium is surrounded by a  speedway track which was used mostly for Motorcycle speedway, though the stadium also hosted stock car racing.

After finishing at the bottom of the National League in 1948 and 1949, the Boomerangs folded and were replaced in 1950 by the Odsal Tudors. Despite the name change, fortunes remained the same with the Tudors finishing on the bottom of the NL ladder in 1951. In 1959 the Tudors dropped the Odsal name and were renamed the Bradford Tudors.

In 1960, the Bradford Tudors renamed themselves the Bradford Panthers. After a disastrous 1960 season, the Panthers left Odsal and in 1961 moved across town to the Greenfield Stadium, better known for greyhound racing. After the Panthers folded in 1962, Motorcycle Speedway would not return to Bradford for another 10 years.

Speedway returned to Odsal when promoters Les Whaley, Mike Parker and Bill Bridgett moved the British League Division Two side Nelson Admirals across the Pennines for the final eleven league meetings of the 1970 season. The Admirals adopted the Bradford Northern name and colours, though the move was met with opposition from the nearby Halifax Dukes. Northern would finish second in Division Two in 1971, but from there results and attendances steadily declined and the team folded in 1973.

The following year, Bradford Barons were formed, but they were also short lived and only lasted the years 1974 and 1975. Speedway would once again not return to Bradford for another 10 years.

Speedway returned to Odsal in 1985 when it was selected by the FIM to host the 1985 World Final, the first time the Final in England would not be held at Wembley Stadium. In the three years after the 1981 World Final at Wembley, international speedway's home in Great Britain had been the White City Stadium in London. However, with the closure of White City in 1985 a new home would be needed and the 30,000 capacity Odsal was chosen. A capacity crowd at the 1985 World Final saw a titanic fight between Denmark's defending World Champion Erik Gundersen, his fellow countryman Hans Nielsen, and American rider Sam Ermolenko. The trio all finished the meeting on 13 points each which saw a three-way runoff for the top 3 placings with Gundersen winning from Nielsen and Ermolenko. Just a month prior to the World Final, Odsal also hosted the Overseas Final as part of the World Final qualifications. That meeting saw two riders finish at the top on 14 points, American Shawn Moran and English favourite, Halifax Dukes rider Kenny Carter. Moran would defeat Carter in the runoff for the Overseas title.

In March 1986, Odsal opened its doors to British League action for the first time since the 1950s after the Halifax Dukes were offered a new home track. The new 'Bradford Dukes' team would in later years include World Champions Gary Havelock and Mark Loram, multiple British and Long Track World Champions Simon Wigg and Kelvin Tatum, and dual Australian Champion Glenn Doyle. However, the club suffered the tragic loss of Kenny Carter who died in murder/suicide after shooting his wife and then himself at their home in May 1986.

Odsal Stadium hosted its second World Final in 1990. Swedish rider Per Jonsson won his only World Championship when he defeated Shawn Moran in a runoff after both had finished the meeting on 13 points. Moran was later stripped of his silver medal by the FIM after he had tested positive to a drug test taken three months earlier at the Overseas Final in Coventry. Moran claimed that the drug he took was a pain killer prescribed by a doctor in Sweden, but the FIM stood firm. They also did not upgrade the standings and the official records show no second place rider. Young Australian rider Todd Wiltshire riding in his first World Final surprised many by finishing in third place with 12 points.

From 1987, Bradford speedway then enjoyed its greatest period of success, winning eight trophies until the club's closure in 1997 when despite winning the Elite League, the club folded for the third time.

Odsal Stadium hosted the 1997 Speedway Grand Prix of Great Britain. Danish rider Brian Andersen won the Grand Prix from America's reigning World Champion Billy Hamill, with Swede Jimmy Nilsen finishing third in the Final. Bradford Dukes rider Mark Loram finished 4th in the Final. Loram would later go on to be the 2000 World Champion after winning the Speedway Grand Prix series that year.

Individual World Championship

World Pairs Championship

World Team Cup

* Odsal hosted the third of 3 rounds in the Final.

Speedway Grand Prix

Motorsport
On 22 May 2021 motorsport returned to Odsal for the first time in 23 years holding the national banger Stan Woods Memorial for pre 1975 cars. The event was witnessed by 4000 fans, Odsal will also host the BriSCA F1 world championship in September 2021 with drivers intending to come from across Europe.

Layout

The stadium is unusual in its design for Britain, being a bowl shape carved out below ground level.

Rooley Avenue End

Capacity- 7,290 (standing)
The Rooley Avenue End is at the northern end of the stadium. It is open terracing and is where the big screen is erected for televised games. The stand has turnstiles that back onto Rooley Avenue.

East Stand

Capacity- 4,890 (seating)
The East Stand is the only part of the ground that is covered and has seating. The stand runs parallel to the pitch and has "BULLS" spelt out on the seats. The stand houses home supporters and most season ticket holders as well as the press and some executive seats. There are also bars and toilets at the top of the stand.

South Bank

Capacity- 620 (seating)
The South Bank is the stadium's commercial hospitality stand and the most recently built structure, having been completed in 2002. It has two levels, each containing a banqueting suite and seats looking out onto the pitch. Speedway was forced to end its association with Odsal after the hospitality building was built.

West Stand

Capacity- 9,309 (standing)
The West Stand is uncovered terracing and houses the players changing rooms and tunnel as well as TV gantry at the top of the stand. The supporters' bar is in the north-west corner of the stand which also houses a manual scoreboard and clock. At the top of the stand, on ground level with Rooley Avenue, is the car park and club shop and ticket office. There are a few hospitality boxes at the top of the stand, but these have not been used since the construction of the South Bank.

The pitch
The pitch at Odsal has a distinctive concave contour, with the corners behind the try-line noticeably sloping up towards the stands. This was due to the stadium being used to host speedway events when the corners of the pitch were removed to allow full use of the track. With the end of speedway at Odsal, the upturned corners are no longer as pronounced as they once were.

Future
In the run up to the 2012 London Olympics, Bradford City Council bid for an Olympic Legacy Park to be built at Odsal and the Richard Dunn Sport Centre. Bradford's bid was turned down in favour of Sheffield, making the prospect of improvements to Odsal in the near future unlikely.

Sponsorship
For two periods between 2006 and 2017 the ground officially carried the name of the Bradford Bulls' principle sponsor.  From 2006 until 2010 it was referred to as the Grattan Stadium, Odsal due to sponsorship from retail company Grattan. From 2013 until 2017 it was referred to as the Provident Stadium, the sponsors being Provident Financial.

Attendance records
All time record: 
102,569 – 1954 Challenge Cup Final replay –  Halifax vs.   Warrington, 5 May 1954.
 (World record rugby league attendance, stood until 6 March 1999)
Super League record: 
24,020 –  Bradford vs.  Leeds, 3 September 1999.
International record: 
42,685 –  Great Britain vs.  New Zealand, 20 December 1947
World Cup record: 
32,773 –  Great Britain vs.  Australia, 8 October 1960
Speedway record: 
47,050 –  England vs.  Australia, 5 July 1947

See also
 Bradford Bulls
 Speedway Grand Prix of Great Britain

References

Bibliography

External links

 Grattan Stadium Web site (archive copy)

Rugby league stadiums in England
Rugby League World Cup stadiums
Defunct football venues in England
Defunct speedway venues in England
Sports venues in Bradford
Sports venues completed in 1934
1934 establishments in England